The Great Depression is a book written by Canadian author Pierre Berton. 

The period of time between the stock market crash of 1929 and the outbreak of World War II in 1939 had a terrible impact on the lives of all Canadians. The book, The Great Depression is a scalding indictment of the political leaders of the time, the police, the law and of big business. While successive governments at the Federal, Provincial and Municipal level debated over how to deal with the huge numbers of unemployed workers and who would finance government works programs or "the dole", tens of thousands of formerly middle class Canadians suffered in abject poverty while drought seared the western prairies and an unprecedented locust epidemic contributed to record crop failures. The entire decade became known in Canadian historical parlance as "The Dirty Thirties." At the nadir of the depression, half the wage earners nationwide were on some form of relief.

The book The Great Depression chronicles, through personal account and historical records, the events of the decade and the impact these events had on Canada and Canadian culture.

See also
 Great Depression, an article about the event that inspired this book.

1990 non-fiction books
20th-century history books
History books about Canada
Books by Pierre Berton